The Republic of Haiti comprises the western three-eighths of the island of Hispaniola, west of the Dominican Republic. Haiti is positioned east of the neighboring island of Cuba, between the Caribbean Sea and the North Atlantic Ocean. Haiti's geographic coordinates are at a longitude of 72° 25′ west and a latitude of 19° 00′ north.

Haiti has  of coastline and a -border with the Dominican Republic.

Climate

The climate is tropical with some variation depending on altitude. The rainfall pattern is varied, with rain heavier in some of the lowlands and on the northern and eastern slopes of the mountains.

There are two rainy seasons, April–June and October–November. Haiti is subject to periodic droughts and floods, made more severe by deforestation. Atlantic hurricanes are also a menace. For example, Hurricane Matthew caused large amounts of damage when it hit Haiti in 2016.

Physical geography
Haiti's terrain varies, with more than three fourths of the territory above . Its climate is predominantly tropical, with some smaller areas of semi-arid, subtropical, and oceanic climate. Fertile valleys are interspersed between the mountain ranges forming vast areas of contrast between elevations in many areas throughout the territory.

 Haiti's most important valley in terms of crops is the Plaine de l'Artibonite, which is oriented south of the Montagnes Noires. This region supports the country's (also Hispaniola's) longest river, the Riviere l'Artibonite whose watershed begins in the western region of the Dominican Republic and continues most of its length through central Haiti and onward where it empties into the Gulf of Gonâve. The river is navigable for a distance by barge. The eastern and central region of the island is a large elevated plateau.
 The northern region consists of the Massif du Nord (Northern Massif) and the Plaine du Nord (Northern Plain). The Massif du Nord is an extension of the Cordillera Central in the Dominican Republic. It begins at Haiti's eastern border, north of the Guayamouc River, and extends to the northwest through the northern peninsula. The Plateau Central (Central Plateau) extends along both sides of the Guayamouc River, south of the Massif du Nord. It runs from the southeast to the northwest. To the southwest of the Plateau Central are the Montagnes Noires, whose most northwestern part merges with the Massif du Nord.
 The southern region consists of the Plaine du Cul-de-Sac (the southeast) and the mountainous southern peninsula (also known as the Tiburon Peninsula). The Plaine du Cul-de-Sac is a natural depression which harbors the country's saline lakes, such as Trou Caïman and Haiti's largest lake Lac Azuei (also known as Etang Saumatre). The Chaîne de la Selle mountain range, an extension of the southern mountain chain of the Dominican Republic (the Sierra de Baoruco), extends from the Massif de la Selle in the east to the Massif de la Hotte in the west. This mountain range harbors Pic la Selle, the highest point in Haiti at 2,680 metres (8,793 ft).

Islands

Numerous smaller islands make up a part of Haiti's total territory. The most notable islands are:
Île de la Gonâve, the largest offshore island of mainland Hispaniola, is located to the west-northwest of Port-au-Prince in Haiti's Gulf of Gonâve, in the Caribbean Sea (the largest gulf of the Antilles). It has an area of 743 km2. Its Taíno name was Guanabo.  La Gonâve was once a pirate base.
Tortuga (Turtle), the second largest offshore island of the mainland, located off the northwest coast of Hispaniola, it is a Caribbean island. It has an area of 180 km2. The island was a major center of Caribbean piracy during the 17th century and has become famous in many works of literature and film. The island's name derives from the turtle-like shape of the island.
Île à Vache (Cow Island) is a small and lush island located off southwestern of Haiti with a total area is 52 km2.
Les Cayemites, a pair of islands located in the Gulf of Gonâve off the coast of southwest Hispaniola. It has a combined area of 45 km2.
La Navasse, is a rocky outcropping that has been subject to an ongoing territorial dispute with the United States.

Haiti also has several lakes. The largest lake in Haiti, and the second largest lake of the island of Hispaniola and the West Indies, is Lake Azuei. It is located in the Cul-de-Sac Depression with an area of 170 km2. It is a saline lake with a higher concentration of salt than the sea water and harbors numerous fauna such as American crocodiles and American flamingos.

Lake Péligre is an artificial lake created by the construction of the Peligre Hydroelectric Dam.

Trou Caïman is a saltwater lake with a total area of 16.2 km2. Lake Miragoâne is one of the largest natural freshwater lakes in the Caribbean, with an area of 25 km2.

Statistics 
 Maritime claims
 Territorial sea: 
 Contiguous zone: 
 Exclusive economic zone:  and 
 Continental shelf: to depth of exploitation

 Climate
 Tropical; semiarid where mountains in east cut off trade winds
 Terrain
 Mostly rough and mountainous

 Natural resources
 Bauxite, copper, calcium carbonate, gold, marble, hydropower, arable land
 Land use
 Arable land: 36.28%
 Permanent crops: 10.16%
 Other: 53.56% (2012 est.)
 Irrigated land
 970 km3
 Total renewable water resources
 14.03 km3 (2011)
 Freshwater withdrawal (domestic/industrial/agricultural)
 Total: 1.2 km3/yr (17%/3%/80%)
 Per capita: 134.3 m3/yr (2009)
 Natural hazards
 Lies in the middle of the hurricane belt and subject to severe storms from June to October; occasional flooding and earthquakes; periodic droughts
 Extreme points 
 Northernmost point – Pointe Tete de Chien, Tortuga Island, Nord-Ouest Department
Southernmost point – south of Torbeck, Les Cayes Arrondissement
Westernmost point – cape near Anse d'Hainault, Grand'Anse
Easternmost point – border with Dominican Republic, Centre Department
Highest point – Pic la Selle: 2680 m
Lowest point – Caribbean Sea: 0 m
 Environment—current issues
 Extensive deforestation (much of the remaining forested land is being cleared for agriculture and used as fuel); soil erosion; inadequate supplies of potable water
 Environment—international agreements
 Party to: Biodiversity, Climate Change, Desertification, Law of the Sea, Marine Dumping, Marine Life Conservation, Ozone Layer Protection
 Signed, but not ratified: Hazardous Wastes

See also
 Environment of Haiti

References

External resources